Jesús Antonio Valdés Palazuelos (born 13 December 1978) is a Mexican politician affiliated with the PRI. He served as Deputy of the LXII Legislature of the Mexican Congress representing Sinaloa.

References

1978 births
Living people
21st-century Mexican politicians
Members of the Chamber of Deputies (Mexico)
Members of the Congress of Sinaloa
Institutional Revolutionary Party politicians
Politicians from Sinaloa
People from Culiacán